Sneham is a 1977 Indian Malayalam film,  directed by A. Bhim Singh and produced by K. N. S. Jaffarsha. The film stars Sukumari, Adoor Bhasi, Mallika Sukumaran and Master Rajkrishna in the lead roles. The film has musical score by Jaya Vijaya.

Cast

Sukumari
Adoor Bhasi
Mallika Sukumaran
Master Rajkrishna
Master Sridhar
Nellikode Bhaskaran
Vidhubala
Rajendra prasad

Soundtrack
The music was composed by Jaya Vijaya and the lyrics were written by Sreekumaran Thampi.

References

External links
 

1977 films
1970s Malayalam-language films
Films directed by A. Bhimsingh
Films scored by Jaya Vijaya